The Journal of the International Neuropsychological Society is a bimonthly peer-reviewed scientific journal covering neuropsychology. It is the official journal of the International Neuropsychological Society, on whose behalf it is published by Cambridge University Press. The editor-in-chief is Stephen M. Rao (Cleveland Clinic). According to the Journal Citation Reports, the journal has a 2018 impact factor of 3.098, ranking it 62nd out of 142 journals in the category "Psychiatry".

References

External links

Neuropsychology journals
Publications established in 1995
Bimonthly journals
Cambridge University Press academic journals
English-language journals
Academic journals associated with international learned and professional societies